Ángel Carrasco Nolasco (1907 – 11 June 1943) was a Spanish Socialist Workers' Party politician. He fought in the Spanish Civil War on the side of the Second Spanish Republic. After the Nationalist victory, he was executed by the government of Francisco Franco.

References
 NÚÑEZ, Mirta y ROJAS, Antonio, Consejo de Guerra. Los fusilamientos en el Madrid de la posguerra (1939-1945), Madrid, Compañía Literaria, 1997. .
 GARCÍA MÁRQUEZ, José María: Golpe militar, resistencia y represión (1936-1950). 2ª edición, 2008. Ed. Fundación FUDEPA. , pág. 94.

1907 births
1943 deaths
Spanish Socialist Workers' Party politicians
Spanish military personnel of the Spanish Civil War (Republican faction)
People executed by Francoist Spain